Theo van de Vendel (born 24 October 1980) is a Dutch Olympic eventing rider. He competed at the 2016 Summer Olympics in Rio de Janeiro where he was eliminated in the individual and finished 6th in the team competition.

Van de Vendel also participated at the 2015 European Eventing Championships, where he finished 4th in the team event.

References

Living people
1980 births
Dutch male equestrians
Equestrians at the 2016 Summer Olympics
Olympic equestrians of the Netherlands